Juan de Escalante Turcios y Mendoza (1608 – 31 May 1681) was a Roman Catholic prelate who served as Archbishop (Personal Title) of Yucatán (1679–1681) and Archbishop of Santo Domingo (1672–1679).

Biography
Juan de Escalante Turcios y Mendoza was born in Andalucía, Spain in 1608. On 23 October 1672, he was selected by the King of Spain and confirmed by Pope Clement X as Archbishop of Santo Domingo. In 1673, he was consecrated bishop by Luís de Cifuentes y Sotomayor, Bishop of Yucatán. On 29 December 1679, he was selected by the King of Spain and confirmed by Pope Innocent XI as Archbishop (Personal Title) of Yucatán. He served as Bishop of Yucatán until his death on 31 May 1681.

References

External links and additional sources
 (for Chronology of Bishops) 
 (for Chronology of Bishops) 
 (for Chronology of Bishops) 
 (for Chronology of Bishops) 

17th-century Roman Catholic bishops in Mexico
Bishops appointed by Pope Clement X
Bishops appointed by Pope Innocent XI
1608 births
1671 deaths
Roman Catholic archbishops of Santo Domingo
17th-century Roman Catholic archbishops in the Dominican Republic